Cochlespira cedonulli is a species of sea snail, a marine gastropod mollusk in the family Cochlespiridae,.

Description
The size of an adult shell varies between 20 mm and 35 mm.

In view of the ambiguity of Reeve's figure it might be well to say that this species has no axial sculpture on the whorls between the carina and the base except what may be due to accidents during growth. The surface is normally smooth and polished, above and below the carina, and of a delicate pale brown color.

Distribution
This marine species occurs from the Gulf of California, West Mexico to Peru and also off the Galápagos.

References

 Reeve, Proc. Zool. Soc., London, 1843, p. 185
 Finet, Yves, et al. "CDF Checklist of Galapagos marine mollusks." Charles Darwin Foundation Galapagos species checklist (2011): 1–164.

External links
 
 Ramírez, Rina, Carlos Paredes, and José Arenas. "Moluscos del Perú." Revista de Biología Tropical 51 (2003): 225-284.

cedonulli
Gastropods described in 1843